Jubal Rocha Mendes Júnior (born 29 August 1993), simply known as Jubal, is a Brazilian professional footballer who plays as a centre-back for  club Auxerre.

Club career
Born in Inhumas, Goiás, Jubal began his career on Vila Nova. He made his professional debut on 13 February 2011, against Aparecidense for the Campeonato Goiano championship.

In June, Jubal was transferred to Santos, being assigned to the youth setup. He made his debut for the club on 30 January 2013, starting in a 1–0 Campeonato Paulista away win against Ituano; it was his maiden appearance of the year.

Profiting from Edu Dracena's injury, Jubal started the first game of the 2014 campaign, a 1–0 home success over XV de Piracicaba on 18 January. Three days later he scored his first professional goal, netting the last through a header in a 1–1 away draw against Audax.

Jubal made his Série A debut on 20 April, coming on as a substitute for Neto in a 1–1 home draw against Sport Recife. On 11 June 2015 he was loaned to fellow league team Avaí, until the end of the year.

On 29 January 2016, Jubal rescinded with Santos and moved to Primera Liga side Arouca, with his former club retaining 50% of his federative rights. After being a regular starter, he moved to fellow league team Vitória de Guimarães on 18 August 2017, on a one-year loan deal.

On 2 September 2019, Jubal signed with Vitória de Setúbal.

Career statistics

Honours
Santos
Campeonato Paulista: 2015
Copa São Paulo de Futebol Júnior: 2013

Brazil U20
Toulon Tournament: 2013
Valais Youth Cup:2013

References

External links

1993 births
Living people
Sportspeople from Goiás
Brazilian footballers
Association football defenders
Campeonato Brasileiro Série A players
Primeira Liga players
Liga Portugal 2 players
Ligue 1 players
Ligue 2 players
Vila Nova Futebol Clube players
Santos FC players
Avaí FC players
F.C. Arouca players
Vitória S.C. players
Portimonense S.C. players
Boavista F.C. players
Vitória F.C. players
AJ Auxerre players
Brazil under-20 international footballers
Brazilian expatriate footballers
Brazilian expatriate sportspeople in Portugal
Brazilian expatriate sportspeople in France
Expatriate footballers in Portugal
Expatriate footballers in France